Arctostaphylos insularis is a species of manzanita known by the common name island manzanita. It is endemic to Santa Cruz Island, one of the Channel Islands of California.

Description
It has waxy, reddish bark and the smaller twigs sometimes have bristly glandular hairs. The shrub blooms in many dense clustered inflorescences of urn-shaped flowers.

Habitat
Arctostaphylos insularis grows in the chaparral, oak woodland, and coastal pine forest habitat of its native island.

See also
California chaparral and woodlands
California coastal sage and chaparral ecoregion

References

External links
Arctostaphylos insularis. The Jepson Manual.
Arctostaphylos insularis. USDA PLANTS.
Arctostaphylos insularis. CalPhotos gallery.

insularis
Endemic flora of California
Natural history of the California chaparral and woodlands
Natural history of the Channel Islands of California
Natural history of Santa Barbara County, California
Plants described in 1887